Lancaster Community Hospital (LCH) was a private hospital located in Lancaster, California. It was closed after the opening of Palmdale Regional Medical Center.

External links
Hospital site

Hospitals in Los Angeles County, California
Buildings and structures in Lancaster, California
Hospital buildings completed in 1975
1975 establishments in California